In mathematics, a Kleinian model is a model of a three-dimensional hyperbolic manifold N by the quotient space  where  is a discrete subgroup of PSL(2,C).  Here, the subgroup , a Kleinian group, is defined so that it is isomorphic to the fundamental group  of the surface N. Many authors use the terms Kleinian group and Kleinian model interchangeably, letting one stand for the other.  The concept is named after Felix Klein.

Many properties of Kleinian models are in direct analogy to those of Fuchsian models; however, overall, the theory is less well developed. A number of unsolved conjectures on Kleinian models are the analogs to theorems on Fuchsian models.

See also
Hyperbolic 3-manifold

References

Hyperbolic geometry
Kleinian groups